Nawabi is an Afghan sub clan mega Barakzai the majority of this clan played an important role during the Barakzai dynasty - such as Ismail Khan Nawabi.

The name Nawabi is borrowed from the Arabic, being the honorific plural of Naib or "deputy". The name Nawab is mostly used among South Asians. In Bengal it is pronounced Nowab.

References 

Durrani Pashtun tribes
Royal titles
Nawabs of India